Malcolm Graham (born January 14, 1963)  is a former Democratic member of the North Carolina Senate, US, where he represented District 40 (Mecklenburg County). He was first elected in 2004, defeating former senator Fountain Odom in the Democratic primary and Republican Brian Sisson in the general election. He served in the Senate until 2014, when he ran unsuccessfully ran for the United States House of Representatives in District 12.

From 1999 until his election to the Senate in 2004, Graham served as a Charlotte City Council Member representing the city's 4th District.

In 2019, Graham ran for the Charlotte City Council again. He won the Democratic primary for the District 2 seat on Sept. 10, 2019, and the general election on Nov. 5, 2019.

Personal life and family

Graham was born in Charleston, South Carolina and first came to Charlotte in 1981 to attend Johnson C. Smith University on a tennis scholarship. He is the founder of the Center for Supplier Diversity and has served in leadership roles for Bank of America and Time-Warner Cable. Graham currently serves as Special Assistant to the President for Government and Community Relations at Johnson C. Smith University.

Graham and his wife, Kim, have two daughters, Cortney and Nicole. His sister Cynthia was murdered by white supremacist Dylann Roof in the Charleston church shooting in 2015.

References

External links
Raleigh News & Observer profile
Project Vote Smart - Senator Malcolm Graham (NC) profile
Follow the Money - Malcolm Graham
2006 2004 campaign contributions

Democratic Party North Carolina state senators
Living people
African-American state legislators in North Carolina
1963 births
Charlotte, North Carolina City Council members
Politicians from Charleston, South Carolina
21st-century American politicians
21st-century African-American politicians
20th-century African-American people